Bad Timing and Other Stories is the second official recording by The Triffids, released as a 7" extended play in April 1983. Its four tracks were produced by Robert Ash for White Records Label an imprint of Mushroom Records.

Although the band had admired Ash's work with the Only Ones, they were disappointed with the results. McComb said, "It was good in one way, because it made us realise that the band could produce itself by that stage, and that we'd learnt enough after making 4 records. In fact, we probably should have started producing ourselves earlier. In our case, as long as we have the right engineer, we can make all the right decisions."

Track listing 

 "Bad Timing"
 "Left to Rot"
 "Being Driven"
 "Snake Pit"

Personnel 
Credited to:
 David McComb - lead vocals, guitar, organ, piano, synthesiser
 Robert McComb - guitar, violin, organ
 Alsy MacDonald - drums, vocals, piano
 Martyn Casey - bass, vocals
 Simon 'LeTact' Cromack - percussion

References 

1983 EPs
The Triffids EPs